Papilio rogeri, the pink-spotted swallowtail, is a butterfly of the family Papilionidae (swallowtails). It is found in central and southern Mexico. One stray has been reported from the lower Rio Grande Valley in Texas, United States.

Description
Forewing lighter in color from the apex of the cell outwards, the dark basal area rounded distally; hindwing with suggestion of a small tail; some red spots on the disc, in two separate rows, in the male the proximal spots very small, usually only indicated; in the female all the spots larger than in the male.

The wingspan is 84–95 mm.

Biology
Adults are on wing from February to October in Mexico and in April in southern Texas.

The larvae feed on Rutaceae species. Adults feed on flower nectar.

Subspecies
Papilio rogeri rogeri – (Mexico)
Papilio rogeri pharnaces Doubleday, 1846 – (Mexico) More or less distinctly tailed, hindwing with two separated rows of red spots, the proximal spots in the male often very small.

References

Lewis, H.L. (1974). Butterflies of the World  Page 25, figure 10 (ssp.pharnaces

External links

Butterflies and Moths of North America

rogeri
Papilionidae of South America
Butterflies described in 1836